De Rooij or De Rooy is a Dutch surname meaning "the red one". People with this surname include:

Gerard de Rooy (born 1980), Dutch truck racer, son of Jan
 (born 1943), Dutch truck racer, father of Gerard
Jan de Rooij (1932–2008), Dutch Olympic boxer
 (born 1981), German film score composer
 (born 1946), Dutch cabaretier
Nelly de Rooij (1883–1964), Dutch zoologist and herpetologist
Theo de Rooij (born 1957), Dutch bicycle racer and directeur sportif
Willem de Rooij (born 1969), Dutch film and installation artist
 Kayla De Rooy (born 1993), Australian author/poet

References

Dutch-language surnames